The Karabakh movement (also the Artsakh movement Արցախյան շարժում) was a national mass movement in Armenia and Nagorno-Karabakh from 1988 to 1991 that advocated for the transfer of the mainly Armenian-populated Nagorno-Karabakh Autonomous Oblast of neighboring Azerbaijan to the jurisdiction of Armenia.

Initially, the movement was entirely devoid of any anti-Soviet sentiment and did not call for independence of Armenia. The Karabakh Committee, a group of intellectuals, led the movement from 1988 to 1989. It transformed into the Pan-Armenian National Movement (HHSh) by 1989 and won majority in the 1990 parliamentary election. In 1991, both Armenia and Nagorno-Karabakh declared independence from the Soviet Union. The intense fighting known as the first Nagorno-Karabakh War turned into a full-scale war by 1992.

Timeline

1987
September: the Union for National Self-Determination, the first non-Communist party, established in Armenia by Paruyr Hayrikyan
October 17: the first protests concerning ecological issues held in Yerevan 
October 18: a minor rally on Freedom Square, Yerevan for the unification of Karabakh with Armenia

1988
February 13: First demonstration in Stepanakert. Traditionally considered the start of the movement.
February 18–26: Major demonstrations held in Yerevan for the unification of Karabakh with Armenia.
February 20: the NKAO Supreme Council issued a request to transfer the region to Soviet Armenia
February 22–23: Local Armenians and Azerbaijanis clash in Askeran, resulting in several deaths 
February 26: Demonstrations paused after Mikhail Gorbachev's asked for time to develop a position.
February 27–29: Sumgait pogrom starts, Armenians of Azerbaijan start to leave in large numbers
March 9: Gorbachev meets with the leaders of Armenia and Azerbaijan Karen Demirchyan and Kamran Baghirov in Moscow to discuss the public demands of unification of Armenia and Karabakh.
March 22: Over 100,000 people discontented with the tendencies demonstrate in Yerevan.
March 23: The Supreme Soviet of the Soviet Union rejects the demand of NKAO Regional Party.
March 25: Gorbachev rejects Armenian claims, forbade demonstrations in Yerevan.
March 26: Despite not being authorized by the Moscow government, tens of thousands demonstrate in Yerevan.
March 30: NKAO Communist Party adopts a resolution demanding unification.
April 24: Hundreds of thousands of Armenians march to the genocide memorial in Yerevan.
May 21: Karen Demirchyan resigns. 
May 28: Flag of Armenia first raised in front of Matenadaran.
June 15: Soviet Armenian Supreme Council votes in favor of the unification of NKAO.
June 17: Soviet Azerbaijani Supreme Council opposes the transfer of NKAO to Armenia.
June 28–29: Conference of the Communist Party of the Soviet Union disapproves Armenian claims to NKAO.
July 5: Zvartnots Airport clash, the Soviet troops confronted by protesters in Zvartnots Airport, one man left dead, tens injured. 
July 12: NKAO Soviet Council votes in favor of unification with Armenia.
July 18: Soviet Supreme Council refuses Armenian claims. 
July 21: Paruyr Hayrikyan deported to Ethiopia.
fall: Around 150,000 Azerbaijanis of Armenia start to leave in large numbers. 
September: State of emergency declared in Stepanakert after Armenian and Azerbaijanis clash.
November: Kirovabad pogrom
November 7: Hundreds of thousands demonstrate in Yerevan to support the Karabakh Committee.
November 22: Soviet Armenian Supreme Council recognizes the Armenian Genocide.
November 24: State of emergency declared in Yerevan.
December 7: Armenian earthquake.
December 10: Karabakh Committee members arrested, sent to Moscow.

1989
March 16:  Metsamor Nuclear Power Plant shut down.
May 31: Karabakh Committee members freed.
December 1: Soviet Armenian Supreme Council and NKAO Supreme Council declare the unification of the two entities

1990
January 13–19: Pogrom of Armenians in Baku.
May 20: 1990 Armenian parliamentary election, pro-independence members form majority. 
August 4: Levon Ter-Petrosyan elected chairman of the Supreme Council, de facto leader of Armenia. 
August 23: Soviet Armenian Supreme Council declared independence.

1991
April 30 – May 15: First Nagorno-Karabakh War: Soviet and Azeri forces deport thousands of Armenians from Shahumyan during Operation Ring.
August 19–21: 1991 Soviet coup d'état attempt
September 2: Nagorno-Karabakh Republic proclaimed in Stepanakert.

References

Bibliography

Armenia–Azerbaijan relations
Dissolution of the Soviet Union
History of the Republic of Artsakh
Armenian irredentism
First Nagorno-Karabakh War
Politics of the Republic of Artsakh
Political organisations based in the Republic of Artsakh
Protests in Armenia
Protests in Azerbaijan
Protests in the Soviet Union
1988 in the Nagorno-Karabakh Republic
1989 in the Nagorno-Karabakh Republic
1990 in the Nagorno-Karabakh Republic
1991 in the Nagorno-Karabakh Republic
1988 protests
1989 protests
1990 protests
1991 protests